Darlene Cates (born Rita Darlene Guthrie; December 13, 1947 – March 26, 2017) was an American actress. She became known for her role in the 1993 film What's Eating Gilbert Grape, in which she played the title character's housebound mother.

Career
Author and screenwriter Peter Hedges saw a tape of Cates on a 1992 episode of Sally entitled "Too Heavy to Leave Their House". On the show, she discussed her battle with obesity and how it had affected her life. In 1986, pelvic infections caused by her excess weight kept her bedridden for two years, during which she gained an additional . Hedges offered her the role of a morbidly obese mother in the 1993 film What's Eating Gilbert Grape, which she accepted. Television roles followed on the shows Picket Fences in 1994 and Touched by an Angel in 1996. She had a small role in the 2001 film Wolf Girl. Producer J. Miles Dale flew a small crew and the film's stars from Romania to Texas to shoot their scenes with Cates.

Her performance in What's Eating Gilbert Grape, her first attempt at acting in any form, received critical acclaim and was lauded by her costars Leonardo DiCaprio and Johnny Depp.

Personal life
Cates married Robert Cates, a U.S. Marine, on January 11, 1963. She had one daughter, Sheri Ann, and two sons, Mark and Chris. She had four grandchildren and lived in Forney, Texas. In 1992, she received her high school diploma via correspondence courses. In 2012, Cates had lost 240 pounds after a series of health issues in 2010 kept her hospitalized for nearly a year, and she expressed a desire to resume her acting career.

Death
Cates died in her sleep at age 69 on March 26, 2017. Her daughter, Sheri Cates Morgan, announced her passing on a Facebook post.

Filmography

Film

Television

References

External links

Burial https://www.findagrave.com/memorial/177845483/darlene-cates

1947 births
2017 deaths
American film actresses
American television actresses
People from Borger, Texas
20th-century American actresses
21st-century American actresses
Actresses from Dallas
People from Dumas, Texas
People from Forney, Texas